Richard Andrew Palethorpe-Todd  (11 June 19193 December 2009) was an Irish-British actor known for his leading man roles of the 1950s. He received a Golden Globe Award for Most Promising Newcomer – Male, and an Academy Award for Best Actor nomination and a Golden Globe Award for Best Actor nomination for his performance as Corporal Lachlan MacLachlan in the 1949 film The Hasty Heart. His other notable roles include Jonathan Cooper in Stage Fright (1950), Wing Commander Guy Gibson in The Dam Busters (1955), Sir Walter Raleigh in The Virgin Queen (1955), and Major John Howard in The Longest Day (1962). He was previously a Captain in the British Army during World War II,  fighting in the D-Day landings as a member of the 7th (Light Infantry) Parachute Battalion.

Early life and career
Richard Todd was born in Dublin. His father, Andrew William Palethorpe-Todd, was an Irish physician and an international Irish rugby player who gained three caps for his country. Richard spent a few of his childhood years in India, where his father, an officer in the British Army, served as a physician. Later his family moved to Devon, and Todd attended Shrewsbury School.

Upon leaving school, Todd trained for a potential military career at Sandhurst before beginning his acting training at the Italia Conti Academy in London. This change in career led to estrangement from his mother. When he learned at the age of 19 that she had committed suicide, he did not grieve long (or so he admitted in later life).

He first appeared professionally as an actor at the Open Air Theatre, Regent's Park in 1936 in a production of Twelfth Night. He played in regional theatres and then co-founded the Dundee Repertory Theatre in Scotland in 1939. He also appeared as an extra in British films including Good Morning, Boys (1937), A Yank at Oxford (1938) and Old Bones of the River (1939).

Military service 

Todd enlisted soon after the outbreak of the Second World War, entering the Royal Military College, Sandhurst in late 1939. On 29 January 1941, he was one of 26 cadets injured when 'D' Block of New College was hit by a German bomb in an attack by the Luftwaffe. In his memoirs, he describes seeing the bomb pass through the ceiling in front of him before he was blown out of the building by its blast, landing on a grass bank and suffering lacerations; five cadets were killed in the incident. Todd passed out (i.e, completed the course) in the spring of 1941;. On the day he received his commission, he tried to join several friends at the Café de Paris in London, but could not get a table booked for the evening. That evening, the venue was destroyed in an air raid and 15 newly commissioned subalterns were killed.

He was commissioned into the 2nd/4th Battalion of the King's Own Yorkshire Light Infantry (KOYLI). Following arctic warfare training in Iceland he returned to the UK as a lieutenant (having been promoted to that rank on 1 October 1942). For a short while he was posted, at his request, as liaison officer to the 42nd Armoured Division then applied to join the Parachute Regiment to have a better chance at seeing action. He was accepted and after training was posted to the 7th (Light Infantry) Parachute Battalion as part of the 6th Airborne Division. On 6 June 1944, he participated in Operation Tonga during the D-Day landings. He was among the first British soldiers to land in Normandy and the first Irishman. His battalion parachuted after glider-borne forces had landed to capture the Pegasus Bridge near Caen. During the operation he met Major John Howard on the bridge and was involved in helping to repulse counter-attacks by the  forces in the area. Five days after D-Day, while still in the bridge defence area, he was promoted to captain. Todd later played Howard in the 1962 film The Longest Day, recreating these events.

After three months fighting in Normandy, the 6th Airborne Division returned to the UK to reconstitute and went back to the continent three months later as emergency reinforcements to halt the Battle of the Bulge the German offensive in the Ardennes. Short of transport as they advanced into Germany, Todd, as the motor transport officer, was responsible for gathering a rag-tag selection of commandeered vehicles to ferry troops forward. After VE day, the division returned to the UK for a few weeks, then was sent on counter-insurgency operations in Palestine. During this posting he was seriously injured when his Jeep overturned, breaking both shoulders and receiving a concussion. He returned to the UK to be demobilised in 1946.

Career

Associated British Picture Corporation
After the war, Todd was unsure what direction to take in his career. His former agent, Robert Lennard, had become a casting agent for Associated British Picture Corporation and advised him to try out for the Dundee Repertory Company. Todd did so, performing in plays such as Claudia, where he appeared with Catherine Grant-Bogle, who became his first wife. Lennard arranged for a screen test and Associated British offered him a long-term contract in 1948. He was cast in the lead in For Them That Trespass (1949), directed by Alberto Cavalcanti. The film was a minor hit and Todd's career was launched.

Todd had appeared in the Dundee Repertory stage version of John Patrick's play The Hasty Heart, portraying the role of Yank and was chosen to appear in the 1948 London stage version of the play, this time in the leading role of Cpl. Lachlan McLachlan. This led to his being cast in that role in the Warner Bros. film adaptation of the play, filmed in Britain, alongside Ronald Reagan and Patricia Neal. Todd was nominated for the Academy Award for Best Actor for the role in 1949. He was also voted favourite British male film star in Britain's National Film Awards.
 The film was the tenth most popular movie at the British box office in 1949.

Todd became much in demand. He was lent to Constellation Films to appear in the thriller The Interrupted Journey (1949). Alfred Hitchcock then used him in Stage Fright (1950), opposite Marlene Dietrich and Jane Wyman – Hitchcock's first British film in Britain since 1939.

Associated British put him in the drama Portrait of Clare (1950), which did not perform well at the box office. Neither did Flesh and Blood (1951) for London Films, in which Todd had a dual role. Director King Vidor offered Todd a lead in  Lightning Strikes Twice (1951).

Disney
Far more popular was The Story of Robin Hood and His Merrie Men (1952), in which Todd played the title role for Walt Disney Productions.

Associated British put him in 24 Hours of a Woman's Life (1952), with Merle Oberon. The Rank Organisation borrowed him for Venetian Bird (1952), directed by Ralph Thomas.

Disney reunited the Robin Hood team in The Sword and the Rose (1953), with Todd as Charles Brandon, 1st Duke of Suffolk. It was not as popular as Robin Hood in the U.S. but performed well in Europe. The same went for Disney's Rob Roy, the Highland Rogue (1953), in which Todd played the title role. Disney pulled back on making costume films as a result.

In 1953, he appeared in a BBC television adaptation of the novel Wuthering Heights as Heathcliff. Nigel Kneale, responsible for the adaptation, said the production came about purely because Todd had turned up at the BBC and told them that he would like to play Heathcliff for them. Kneale had only a week to write the script, as the broadcast was rushed into production.

20th Century Fox
Todd's career received a boost when 20th Century-Fox signed him to a non-exclusive contract and cast him as the United States Senate Chaplain Peter Marshall in the film version of Catherine Marshall's best selling biography A Man Called Peter (1955), which was a popular success.

Even more popular was The Dam Busters (1955) in which Todd played Wing Commander Guy Gibson. This was the most successful film at the British box office in 1955  and became the defining role of Todd's movie career.

20th Century Fox offered Todd The Virgin Queen (1955), playing Sir Walter Raleigh opposite Bette Davis' Queen Elizabeth I. It did not do as well as Peter.

In France, he played Axel Fersen opposite Michèle Morgan in Marie Antoinette Queen of France (1956), which was popular in France but not widely seen elsewhere. Fox cast him in D-Day the Sixth of June (1956), opposite Robert Taylor, which was a mild success.

Yangtse Incident: The Story of H.M.S. Amethyst (1957) was an attempt to repeat the success of The Dam Busters, with the same director (Michael Anderson) and Todd playing another real-life hero. It was popular in Britain but not on the scale of The Dam Busters. He was Dunois, Bastard of Orléans in Saint Joan (1957), directed by Otto Preminger.

Decline as Star
Chase a Crooked Shadow (1958) was a thriller with director Anderson for Associated British. Intent to Kill (1958) was another thriller, this time for Fox, with Betsy Drake. He returned to war films with Danger Within (1958), a POW story. Then there were more thrillers, with Never Let Go (1960), directed by John Guillermin and co-starring Peter Sellers in a rare straight acting role; Todd gave what has been called one of his best performances.

Few of these films had been overly popular but Todd was still the top-billed star of The Long and the Short and the Tall (1961), with Laurence Harvey and Richard Harris. He tried comedy with Don't Bother to Knock (1961), then made The Hellions (1961).

Todd's cinema career rapidly declined in the 1960s as the counter-culture movement in the Arts became fashionable in Britain, with social-realist dramas commercially replacing the more middle-class orientated dramatic productions that Todd's performance character-type had previously excelled in.

The Boys (1962) was a courtroom drama film in which Todd played the lead prosecuting barrister. He had a good part among the many stars in The Longest Day (1962), playing Major John Howard during the airborne action just before and on D-Day in which he had taken part in 1944 (another actor portrayed Todd); this was his biggest hit for some time. He appeared in The Very Edge (1963), a thriller, then he played Harry Sanders in two films for Harry Alan Towers: Death Drums Along the River(1963) and Coast of Skeletons (1965). He also had a small role in Anderson's Operation Crossbow (1965).

In 1964. he was a member of the jury at the 14th Berlin International Film Festival.

He had a supporting part in The Battle of the Villa Fiorita (1965) and the lead in The Love-Ins (1968).

Later career
In the 1970s, he gained new fans when he appeared as the reader for Radio Four's Morning Story. In the 1980s, his distinctive voice was heard as narrator of Wings Over the World, a 13-part documentary series about the history of aviation shown on Arts & Entertainment television. He appeared before the camera in the episode about the Lancaster bomber. Todd continued to act on television, including roles in Virtual Murder; Silent Witness and in the Doctor Who story "Kinda" in 1982. In 1989, he appeared in the first episode of the sixth season of Murder, She Wrote in which he played Colonel Alex Schofield in the episode titled "Appointment in Athens".

He formed Triumph Theatre Productions with Duncan C. Weldon and Paul Elliott in the late 1960s. This company produced more than 100 plays, musicals and pantomimes all over the country; some of them starred Todd.

His acting career extended into his 80s, and he made several appearances in British shows such as Heartbeat and The Royal. He appeared in The Royal as Hugh Hurst, a retired solicitor, in the episode "Kiss and Tell" (2003); his last appearance in Heartbeat was as Major Harold Beecham in the 2007 episode "Seeds of Destruction".

Richard Todd was appointed an Officer of the Order of the British Empire (OBE) in 1993.

He was the subject of This Is Your Life on two occasions: in March 1960 when he was surprised by Eamonn Andrews at the BBC's Lime Grove Studios; and in November 1988 when Michael Aspel surprised him on stage at the Theatre Royal Windsor.

Unmade projects
Todd was the first choice of author Ian Fleming to play James Bond in Dr. No, but a scheduling conflict gave the role to Sean Connery. In the 1960s, Todd unsuccessfully attempted to produce a film of Ian Fleming's The Diamond Smugglers and a television series based on true accounts of the Queen's Messengers. He was also announced for a proposed film about William Shakespeare.

In his book British Film Character Actors (1982), Terence Pettigrew described Todd as "an actor who made the most of what he had, which could be summed up as an inability to sit still while there was a horse to leap astride, a swollen river to swim or a tree to vanish into."

Personal life
Todd was married twice; both marriages ended in divorce. His first wife was actress Catherine Grant-Bogle, whom he met in Dundee Repertory. They were married from 1949 until 1970. They had a son, Peter (1952–2005), and a daughter, Fiona. In 1960 he had a son Jeremy Todd-Nelson with model Patricia Nelson.  He was married to model Virginia Mailer from 1970 until 1992; they had two sons, Andrew and Seumas (1977–1997). In retirement, Todd lived in the village of Little Ponton and later in Little Humby, eight miles from Grantham, Lincolnshire. Two of Todd's five children died by suicide. In 1997, Seumas Palethorpe-Todd shot himself in the head at the family home in Lincolnshire; an inquest determined that the suicide might have been a depressive reaction to the drug he was taking for severe acne. On 21 September 2005, Peter killed himself with a shotgun in East Malling, Kent, following marital difficulties.

Todd was a supporter of Second World War commemoration events, particularly those associated with the Normandy landings and 617 Squadron RAF. He continued to be identified in the public consciousness with Guy Gibson from his portrayal of him in the 1950s film, and attended 617 Squadron anniversaries up to 2008. He narrated a television documentary about the Squadron, and contributed forewords to several books on the subject, including The Dam Buster Story (2003); Filming the Dam Busters (2005); and Bouncing-Bomb Man: The Science of Sir Barnes Wallis (2009).

Death
Todd died from cancer at his home near Grantham in Lincolnshire on 3 December 2009. His body was buried between his two sons Seumas and Peter at St. Guthlac's Church in Little Ponton in the county of Lincolnshire. The gravestone's epitaph reads "Richard Andrew Palethorpe Todd, 1919–2009, husband of Virginia and Kitty, loving father of Peter, Fiona, Andrew, Seumas and Jeremy, Exit Dashing Young Blade" (a reference to the Queen Mother's description of him).

Selected filmography

Box-office rankings
British exhibitors regularly listed Todd among the most popular local stars at the box office in various polls:
1950 – 7th most popular British star
1952 – 5th most popular British star in Britain
1954 – 9th most popular British star
1955 – 7th most popular British star
1957 – 3rd most popular star in Britain

Select theatre credits
An Ideal Husband by Oscar Wilde (1965) – Strand Theatre, London with Margaret Lockwood, Michael Denison, Dulcie Gray and Roger Livesey – also toured South Africa
Dear Octopus by Dodie Smith (1967) – Haymarket Theatre, London
 "The Winslow Boy" (1971) – national tour with Patrick Barr, Elizabeth Sellars and David Nicholas Wilkinson
 " A Christmas Carol" (1971–72) – Theatre Royal, Brighton with Patrick Barr, Elizabeth Sellars, Mervyn Johns and David Nicholas Wilkinson
Sleuth (1972–73) – Australian tour
Equus (1975) – Australian tour
The Business of Murder (1983–91) – Mayfair Theatre, London

Books
Caught in the Act (1986)
In Camera, an Autobiography Continued (1989)

References

External links

British Army Officers 1939−1945
A Day to Remember by Richard Todd
Sixty-seconds interview with Richard Todd

Richard Todd – Daily Telegraph obituary
Selected performances in Theatre Archive, University of Bristol
BBC Inside Out – Richard Todd
Richard Todd – Biography
Imperial War Museum Interview

1919 births
2009 deaths
20th-century British actors
Alumni of the Italia Conti Academy of Theatre Arts
British male film actors
British male television actors
British male stage actors
British Army personnel of World War II
British Parachute Regiment officers
Deaths from cancer in England
Graduates of the Royal Military College, Sandhurst
King's Own Yorkshire Light Infantry officers
Male actors from Devon
Male actors from Dublin (city)
New Star of the Year (Actor) Golden Globe winners
Officers of the Order of the British Empire
People educated at Queen Elizabeth's Grammar School, Wimborne Minster
People educated at Shrewsbury School
People from South Kesteven District
Freemasons of the United Grand Lodge of England
20th Century Studios contract players
British people in colonial India
Burials in Lincolnshire
Military personnel from Dublin (city)